Territorial Assembly elections were held in Niger on 30 March 1952. The Union of Nigerien Independents and Sympathisers won 34 of the 35 seats in the Second College.

Electoral system
The Territorial Assembly was elected using two colleges. The first college was restricted to French citizens and elected 15 members from three constituencies. The second college elected 35 members from seven constituencies, which were based on the seven regions.

Results

References

Elections in Niger
Niger
1952 in Niger
Election and referendum articles with incomplete results
March 1952 events in Africa